Triptis is a town in the Saale-Orla-Kreis district, in Thuringia, Germany. It is situated 22 km southwest of Gera.  The town is the seat of the municipal association Triptis.

History
Within the German Empire (1871–1918), Triptis was part of the Grand Duchy of Saxe-Weimar-Eisenach. In East Germany, it was part of Bezirk Gera.

References

Towns in Thuringia
Saale-Orla-Kreis
Grand Duchy of Saxe-Weimar-Eisenach